Sviatchenko is a surname. Notable people with the surname include:

 Erik Sviatchenko (born 1991), Danish footballer
 Sergei Sviatchenko (born 1952), Ukrainian-born artist

See also
 

Ukrainian-language surnames